Sunday Wilshin (26 February 190519 March 1991) was a British actress and radio producer; the successor to George Orwell on his resignation in 1943. She was born in London as Mary Aline Wilshin (corroborated by publicly available birth records; other sources give Sunday/ Sundae Mary Aline Horne (-) Wilshin) and educated at the Italia Conti Stage School. Wilshin was a member of the 'Bright young things' of the 1920s, and a close friend of the actress Cyllene Moxon and of author (and former actress) Noel Streatfeild. In connection with the 'bright young things', Wilshin commonly appears in accounts of a gathering whereat she was assaulted by the silent film actress Brenda Dean Paul.

Selected filmography
 The Green Caravan (1922)
 Pages of Life (1922)
 Petticoat Loose (1922)
 Hutch Stirs 'em Up (1923)
 Champagne (1928)
 An Obvious Situation (1930)
 The Chance of a Night Time (1931)
 Michael and Mary (1931)
 Nine till Six (1932)
 Collision (1932)
 The Love Contract (1932) 
 Dance Pretty Lady (1932)
 Marry Me (1932)
 To Brighton with Gladys (1933)
 As Good as New (1933)
Borrowed Clothes (1934)
 Murder by Rope (1936)
 First Night (1937)

References

Bibliography
 Low, Rachael. The History of British Film. Volume VII. Routledge, 1997.
 Sutton, David R. A chorus of raspberries: British film comedy 1929–1939. University of Exeter Press, 2000.

External links

1905 births
1991 deaths
British film actresses
Actresses from London
British radio producers
20th-century British actresses
20th-century English women
20th-century English people
Women radio producers